UFC Live: Vera vs. Jones (also known as UFC on Versus 1) was a mixed martial arts event held by the Ultimate Fighting Championship on March 21, 2010 in Broomfield, Colorado, United States at the 1stBank Center. This event was the UFC's debut on Versus. The event was also shown on various international networks including Rogers Sportsnet in Canada, Televisa in Mexico, and ESPN in the UK.

Background
Brandon Vera was previously scheduled to fight Antônio Rogério Nogueira at UFC 109, but Nogueira was forced out of the bout with an ankle injury.

A bout between Clay Guida and Sean Sherk was in the works but Sherk suffered an undisclosed injury and was forced to pull out. Shannon Gugerty stepped in as the replacement against Guida.

John Howard was originally scheduled to fight Anthony Johnson but Johnson was forced to withdraw from the bout with a knee injury. Daniel Roberts came in as Johnson's replacement.

Spencer Fisher was set to fight Duane Ludwig but was forced out of the bout due to an undisclosed injury. Darren Elkins stepped in for the injured Fisher.

Rob Kimmons was forced to pull out of his bout with Mike Pierce from a leg injury. Julio Paulino was Kimmons' replacement.

The event drew an estimated 1,240,000 viewers on Versus.

Results

Bonus awards
Fighters were awarded $50,000 bonuses.

Fight of the Night: Cheick Kongo vs Paul Buentello
Knockout of the Night: John Howard, Cheick Kongo and Junior dos Santos
Submission of the Night: Clay Guida

Reported payout
The following is the reported payout to the fighters as reported to the Colorado Department of
Regulatory Agencies. It does not include sponsor money or "locker room" bonuses often given by the UFC and also do not include the UFC's traditional "fight night" bonuses.

Jon Jones: $40,000 (includes $20,000 win bonus) def. Brandon Vera: $60,000
Junior dos Santos: $70,000 ($35,000 win bonus) def. Gabriel Gonzaga: $67,000
Cheick Kongo: $110,000 ($55,000 win bonus) def. Paul Buentello: $40,000
Alessio Sakara: $42,000 ($21,000 win bonus) def. James Irvin: $20,000
Clay Guida: $50,000 ($25,000 win bonus) def. Shannon Gugerty: $9,000
Vladimir Matyushenko: $56,000 ($28,000 win bonus) def. Eliot Marshall: $10,000
Darren Elkins: $12,000 ($6,000 win bonus) def. Duane Ludwig: $12,000
John Howard: $26,000 ($13,000 win bonus) def. Daniel Roberts: $6,000
Brendan Schaub: $20,000 ($10,000 win bonus) def. Chase Gormley: $10,000
Mike Pierce: $16,000 ($8,000 win bonus) def. Julio Paulino: $6,000
Jason Brilz: $18,000 ($9,000 win bonus) def. Eric Schafer: $13,000

References

See also
 Ultimate Fighting Championship
 List of UFC champions
 List of UFC events
 2010 in UFC

UFC on Versus
2010 in mixed martial arts
Mixed martial arts in Colorado
Events in Broomfield, Colorado
Sports in Broomfield, Colorado
2010 in sports in Colorado